Miroprofen (INN) is an analgesic and NSAID, meaning that it has anti-inflammatory, antipyretic and antiplatelet aggregation activity. Chemically it is a carbocyclic acid and a phenylpropionate.

References 

Nonsteroidal anti-inflammatory drugs
Imidazopyridines